South Tamaqua is a village located along the Little Schuylkill River at the junctions of Routes 309 and 443 in West Penn Township, Schuylkill County, Pennsylvania, United States. It is split between the New Ringgold ZIP code of 17960 and that of Tamaqua ZIP code 18252, and served by the 386 exchange in area code 570.

References

Unincorporated communities in Schuylkill County, Pennsylvania
Unincorporated communities in Pennsylvania